Glasgow East is a constituency of the House of Commons of the UK Parliament, located in the city of Glasgow, Scotland. It elects one Member of Parliament at least once every five years using the first-past-the-post system of voting. It is currently represented by David Linden of the Scottish National Party (SNP) who has been the MP since 2017.

History
Glasgow East is entirely within the Glasgow City Council area, taking in the areas of: Baillieston, Carmyle, Easterhouse, Parkhead, Shettleston and Tollcross.

It was once one of the safest seats for the Labour Party, the areas included in the constituency having returned solely Labour MPs since the 1930s. However, it achieved national prominence when a by-election in 2008 saw the Scottish National Party overturn a majority of over 13,000 votes to gain the seat.  Since then, it has been tightly fought by Labour and the SNP.

During the 2015 general election there was a nationwide surge of support for the SNP, as pro-independence voters rallied to support the party in unprecedented numbers. After votes were counted The Guardian reported: "The SNP swept aside once-unassailable majorities for Labour with swings as high as 35%, as voters threw out Jim Murphy, the Scottish Labour leader, its former deputy leader, Anas Sarwar, and Margaret Curran, the shadow Scottish secretary [in Glasgow East]."

At the 2016 EU referendum, the House of Commons Library estimates that 53% of local voters opted for Britain to Remain a member of the EU, while 47% voted to leave.

The 2017 general election result in the constituency was that election's tenth-closest result, with the SNP holding the seat by a margin of 75 votes. Amid a nationwide backlash against Nicola Sturgeon's plans for a second independence referendum, the SNP's share of the vote dropped by 18%, the Conservative vote nearly trebled and Labour picked up votes from left-wing voters excited by Jeremy Corbyn and the British Labour Party's socialist platform.

In 2019, Linden was re-elected with an increased majority of 5,566 votes, making the seat a comfortable SNP majority.

Boundaries

Glasgow East is one of seven constituencies covering the Glasgow City council area. All are entirely within the council area. Glasgow East comprises the pre-2007 Glasgow City wards of Baillieston, Barlanark, Braidfauld, Easterhouse, Garrowhill, Garthamlock, Greenfield, Mount Vernon, Parkhead, Queenslie, Shettleston, and Tollcross Park.

Prior to the 2005 general election, the city area was covered by ten constituencies, of which two straddled boundaries with other council areas. The Glasgow East constituency includes the area of the former Glasgow Baillieston constituency and parts of the former Glasgow Shettleston constituency. Scottish Parliament constituencies retain the names and boundaries of the older Westminster constituencies.

Glasgow Baillieston had always been represented by MPs from the Labour Party until 2008, as was the predecessor Glasgow Provan constituency from its creation in 1955. Glasgow Shettleston was won by the Labour Party at every general election from 1950 onwards (in 1945 it was won by the Independent Labour Party). In 2008, the SNP succeeded in winning the seat from Labour in a by-election on a very large swing. Prior to the by-election, it had been one of the safest Labour seats in the UK. At the 2010 general election, the seat was regained for Labour by Margaret Curran from John Mason of the SNP; with a large majority of more than 11,000 votes.

The Glasgow East constituency contains part of the M8 motorway and main railway lines into the city centre; Celtic Park, the home ground of Celtic F.C. is located within the constituency.

It is one of the most deprived constituencies in the UK. In 2008, nearly 40% of adults smoke (UK average at the time was 19.2%), and on average there were 25 drug-related deaths a year. Average male life expectancy is 68, five years less than the Scottish average, while in the Shettleston area it is 63. A 2008 World Health Organization report gave the average male life expectancy in Calton as 54, which is lower than it was before the Second World War.

2008 by-election

On 28 June 2008, the sitting MP David Marshall announced he would step down because of a stress-related illness; he was appointed Steward of the Manor of Northstead on 30 June 2008, thus effectively resigning from the House of Commons. Although the seat represented Labour's third-largest majority in Scotland, it faced a strong challenge from the Scottish National Party, hot on the heels of Labour's disastrous performance at the 2008 Henley by-election. Nominations for candidates closed at 4pm on 9 July, and the election took place on 24 July.

On 25 July 2008, and after a recount, the SNP candidate John Mason won the seat with a narrow majority of 365 votes over the Labour Party candidate, Margaret Curran.

Members of Parliament

Elections

Elections in the 2010s

Elections in the 2000s

See also 
Politics of Glasgow

References

♯ This reference gives all recent Glasgow City Westminster election results. You select the year and then the constituency to view the result.

External links
Scottish Election Results 1997 - present

Westminster Parliamentary constituencies in Scotland
Constituencies of the Parliament of the United Kingdom established in 2005
Politics of Glasgow
Parkhead
Baillieston